SS Pennsylvanian was a cargo ship built in 1913 for the American-Hawaiian Steamship Company. During World War I she was requisitioned by the United States Navy and commissioned as USS Pennsylvanian (ID-3511) in September 1918, and renamed two months later to USS Scranton. After her naval service, her original name of Pennsylvanian was restored.

Pennsylvanian was built by the Maryland Steel Company as one of eight sister ships for the American-Hawaiian Steamship Company, and was employed in inter-coastal service via the Isthmus of Tehuantepec and the Panama Canal after it opened. Pennsylvanian was one of the first two steamships to travel eastbound through the canal when it opened in August 1914. During World War I, as both SS Pennsylvanian and USS Scranton, the ship carried cargo and animals to France, and returned American troops after the Armistice in 1918.

After her naval service ended in 1919, she was returned to her original owners and resumed relatively uneventful cargo service over the next twenty years. Early in World War II, the ship was requisitioned by the War Shipping Administration, and shipped cargo on New York – Caribbean routes and transatlantic routes. In mid-July 1944, Pennsylvanian was scuttled as part of the breakwater for one of the Mulberry artificial harbors built to support the Normandy Invasion.

Design and construction 
In September 1911, the American-Hawaiian Steamship Company placed an order with the Maryland Steel Company of Sparrows Point, Maryland, for four new cargo ships—, and Pennsylvanian. The contract cost of the ships was set at the construction cost plus an 8% profit for Maryland Steel, with a maximum cost of $640,000 each. The construction was financed by Maryland Steel with a credit plan that called for a 5% down payment in cash with nine monthly installments for the balance. Provisions of the deal allowed that some of the nine installments could be converted into longer-term notes or mortgages. The final cost of Pennsylvanian, including financing costs, was $70.35 per deadweight ton, which came out to just under $716,000.

Pennsylvanian (Maryland Steel yard no. 127) was the final ship built under the original contract. She was launched on 29 March 1913, and delivered to American-Hawaiian in June. Pennsylvanian had a single quadruple expansion steam engine powered by oil-fired boilers that drove a single screw propeller. The engine had cylinders of 25½ inches (65 cm), 53½ inches (136 cm) and  diameter by  stroke. It was built by the Maryland Steel Company, Sparrows Point, Maryland.

Early career 
When Pennsylvanian began sailing for American-Hawaiian, the company shipped cargo from East Coast ports via the Tehuantepec Route to West Coast ports and Hawaii, and vice versa. Shipments on the Tehuantepec Route would arrive at Mexican ports—Salina Cruz, Oaxaca, for eastbound cargo, and Coatzacoalcos for westbound cargo—and would traverse the Isthmus of Tehuantepec on the Tehuantepec National Railway. Eastbound shipments were primarily sugar and pineapple from Hawaii, while westbound cargoes were more general in nature. Pennsylvanian sailed in this service on the west side of North America.

After the United States occupation of Veracruz on 21 April 1914 (which found six American-Hawaiian ships in Mexican ports), the Huerta-led Mexican government closed the Tehuantepec National Railway to American shipping. This loss of access, coupled with the fact that the Panama Canal was not yet open, caused American-Hawaii to return in late April to its historic route of sailing around South America via the Straits of Magellan. With the opening of the Panama Canal on 15 August, American-Hawaiian ships switched to taking that route. Pennsylvanian, on the west side of the canal when it opened, was one of the first two eastbound steamers to traverse the canal during her trip to New York. When landslides closed the canal in October 1915, all American-Hawaiian ships, including Pennsylvanian, returned to the Straits of Magellan route again.

Pennsylvanians exact movements during 1916 and 1917 are unclear. She may have been in the half of the American-Hawaiian fleet that was chartered for transatlantic service. She may also have been in the group of American-Hawaiian ships chartered for service to South America, delivering coal, gasoline, and steel in exchange for coffee, nitrates, cocoa, rubber, and manganese ore. However, when the United States entered World War I in April 1917, the entire American-Hawaiian fleet, including Pennsylvanian, was requisitioned by the United States Shipping Board (USSB), which then returned the ships for operation by American-Hawaiian.

U.S. Navy service 
On 13 September 1918, Pennsylvanian was transferred to the U.S. Navy at New York and commissioned USS Pennsylvanian (ID-3511) the same day. Assigned to the Navy's Naval Overseas Transportation Service (NOTS), Pennsylvanian loaded a general cargo and sailed for Brest, France, on 30 September. She arrived there on 15 October and sailed for La Pallice the next day, where she unloaded her cargo before departing for New York on 5 November.

Arriving at New York on 15 November, four days after the Armistice, Pennsylvanian was refitted as an animal transport ship, which, among other things, required the building of ramps and stalls for the animals. Sometime in November, probably during her refit, she was renamed USS Scranton, becoming the first U.S. Navy ship named in honor of the Pennsylvania city. Scranton sailed for France on 12 December, arriving at Saint-Nazaire on 29 December, and returning to New York on 29 January 1919.

On 5 February, Scranton was transferred from the NOTS to the Navy's Cruiser and Transport Force, and began conversion to a troop transport to carry American personnel home from France. Navy transport  responded to Scrantons distress call, and attempted to take Scranton under tow. During the day on 28 March, Scranton attempted to run a towline to El Sol by sending a launch in the rolling seas, but it capsized, drowning three men. El Sol stood by Scranton for over 40 hours until minesweeper  arrived and took Scranton under tow. Penguin and Scranton arrived in New York on 3 April, where Scranton entered drydock to undergo repairs.

After repairs, Scranton made three roundtrips to France and carried some 6,000 troops and passengers home to the United States before she was decommissioned on 19 July. The ship was handed over to the USSB for return to American-Hawaiian, who restored her original name.

Interwar years 
Pennsylvanian resumed cargo service with American-Hawaiian after her return from World War I service. Though the company had abandoned its original Hawaiian sugar routes by this time, Pennsylvanian continued inter-coastal service through the Panama Canal in a relatively uneventful career. One incident of note occurred on 28 November 1930, when Pennsylvanian hit a Southern Pacific ferry near Goat Island (present-day Yerba Buena Island) in a dense fog in San Francisco Bay. No one on either ship was injured.

Other hints of Pennsylvanians activities throughout the rest of her career can be found from contemporary newspaper reports. In October 1929, the Los Angeles Times reported on a shipment that included 2,500 to 3,000 radio sets among Pennsylvanians  of cargo. In March 1938, The Christian Science Monitor reported that Pennsylvanians captain, C. M. Bamforth, had temporarily turned the deck of the cargo ship into a boatyard to build a  catboat for his son in Swampscott, Massachusetts. Bamforth laid the keel while in San Francisco, bought copper rivets for the hull planking in Portland, Oregon, and began painting the boat after Pennsylvanian had traversed the Panama Canal. He expected to have the boat finished when Pennsylvanian arrived in Boston on 22 April.

In October the same year, Pennsylvanian delivered  of steel parts for the Hale Telescope then under construction at the Palomar Observatory outside San Diego. The ship had picked up the $375,000 cargo in Philadelphia before sailing for San Diego.

World War II 
At some point after the United States entered World War II, Pennsylvanian was requisitioned by the War Shipping Administration (WSA), and, as with her pre-U.S. Navy service in World War I, she continued to be operated by American-Hawaiian. From July to September 1942, Pennsylvanian sailed between New York and Caribbean ports, calling at Trinidad, Key West, Hampton Roads, Guantánamo Bay, and Cristóbal. In January 1943, Pennsylvanian called at Bandar Abbas, Iran, on the Persian Gulf, and returned to Caribbean sailings again by March 1943.

Between May and September 1943, Pennsylvanian made four transatlantic crossings between New York and Liverpool, making intermediate stops in Loch Ewe and Methil while in the United Kingdom. The cargo ship made two New York – Guantánamo Bay roundtrips between September and December before resuming transatlantic sailings. After two New York – Liverpool roundtrips between late December 1943 and April 1944, Pennsylvanian left the United States for the final time on 19 May 1944, arriving in Liverpool on 2 June. She called at the British ports of Methil, Loch Ewe, Clyde, and Milford Haven in late June and early July, and, sailing from Barry in mid July, Pennsylvanian arrived at Saint-Laurent-sur-Mer, France. There she was scuttled as part of the breakwater for the Mulberry artificial harbor built to support the Normandy Invasion.

In March 1945, the WSA offered a payment of $565,910 to American-Hawaiian for Pennsylvanian as part of a $7.2 million settlement for eleven requisitioned American-Hawaiian ships that had either been sunk, scuttled, or were to be retained by the government.

Notes

References

Bibliography

External links 
 

1913 ships
Ships built in Sparrows Point, Maryland
Shipwrecks of France
Cargo ships of the United States Navy
Unique transports of the United States Navy
World War I auxiliary ships of the United States
World War I merchant ships of the United States
World War II merchant ships of the United States
World War II shipwrecks in the Atlantic Ocean